The tawny-browed owl (Pulsatrix koeniswaldiana) is a species of owl in the family Strigidae. It is found in Argentina, Brazil, and Paraguay.

Taxonomy and systematics

The tawny-browed owl may form a superspecies with band-bellied owl (Pulsatrix melanota). It has been suggested that they are conspecific but they have different morphology and vocalizations. It is monotypic.

Description

Males weigh  and females . It has a brown facial disk surrounded by ochre, a white chin patch, and creamy "brows" over chestnut-brown eyes. Its breast, upperparts, and tail are dark chocolate brown, and the tail has white bars. The belly is buff and the rest of the underparts are light ochre. The juvenile is initially almost entirely white and gradually attains adult plumage over several years.

Distribution and habitat

The tawny-browed owl is found in Brazil from Espírito Santo state south to northern Rio Grande do Sul and the immediately adjacent areas of eastern Paraguay and northeastern Argentina. It inhabits humid tropical forest, open woodland, and forest dominated by Araucaria evergreens.

Behavior

Feeding

The tawny-browed owl is nocturnal. It hunts in the canopy from a perch, taking small mammals, birds, large insects, and probably other small vertebrates.

Breeding

The tawny-browed owl's breeding phenology has been poorly studied. Its nesting season has not been determined. The clutch size is usually two, laid in a tree cavity, and incubated by the female. Both parents care for fledged young.

Vocalization

The male tawny-browed owl makes a "[l]ow, descending sequence of guttural, ventriloquial 'brrr brrr brrr brrr' or 'ut ut ut ut ut' notes, accelerating and weaker at [the] end", to which the female responds with a higher pitched call.

Status

The IUCN has assessed the tawny-browed owl as being of Least Concern. Its population size has not been determined, and it is thought to be "relatively rare, or at best uncommon". It occurs in some protected areas, but its Atlantic Forest habitat has been much reduced and fragmented.

References

External links

tawny-browed owl
Birds of the Atlantic Forest
tawny-browed owl
Taxonomy articles created by Polbot
Taxa named by Arnoldo de Winkelried Bertoni
Taxa named by Moisés Santiago Bertoni